Cryptocephalus sanguinicollis is a species of case-bearing leaf beetle in the family Chrysomelidae. It is found in Central America and North America.

Subspecies
These three subspecies belong to the species Cryptocephalus sanguinicollis:
 Cryptocephalus sanguinicollis nigerrimus Crotch, 1874 i c g b
 Cryptocephalus sanguinicollis sanguinicollis Suffrian, 1852 i c g b
 Cryptocephalus sanguinicollis schreibersii Suffrian, 1852 g
Data sources: i = ITIS, c = Catalogue of Life, g = GBIF, b = Bugguide.net

References

Further reading

 
 
 

sanguinicollis
Articles created by Qbugbot
Beetles described in 1852